Mohammadabad is a town and a nagar panchayat in Farrukhabad district in the Indian state of Uttar Pradesh.

Demographics
 India census, Mohammadabad had a population of 24,687. The sex ratio is 864 women per 1000 men. Mohammadabad has an average literacy rate of 78.5%, substantially higher than the national average. The male literacy is 85.63%, and female literacy is 70.12%. In Mohammadabad, 18% of the population is under 6 years of age. Shekhapur Khajuri, Nagla moti near pakhna rly station, dheerpur, Karthiya, Pancham Nagala is famous village in this nagar panchayat and block.

Geography
Mohammadabad has a 61 m elevation from sea level.

†Includes Sikhs (0.2%), Buddhists (<0.2%).

References

Cities and towns in Farrukhabad district